Flisbyen Ballklubb is a Norwegian football club from Lillestrøm. It was founded in 1991.

The men's team currently resides in the Fourth Division, the fifth tier of Norwegian football. In 2011, they played in the Third Division. In 2010 and 2011, the club contracted several former players of Lillestrøm SK and Skjetten SK, such as Torgeir Bjarmann, Harald Hauge, Thomas Bjerk, Marius Gullerud and Mahmod Hejazi.

References

External links
Official site

Football clubs in Norway
Association football clubs established in 1991
Sport in Skedsmo
1991 establishments in Norway